Alma Halliwell (also  Sedgewick  and  Baldwin) is a fictional character from the British ITV soap opera Coronation Street, played by Amanda Barrie. Alma was featured as a recurring character from 1981 to 1982; however, she was reintroduced as a regular in 1988. She remained in the show for a further 13 years, featuring in high-profile storylines such as a problematic marriage to the long-running character Mike Baldwin (Johnny Briggs), kidnapping, and a supermarket siege. Barrie decided to leave the soap in 2001, and Alma was killed-off in a controversial cervical cancer storyline.

Storylines
Alma is first introduced in 1981 as the wife of cafe owner, Jim Sedgewick (Michael O'Hagan). The marriage is a disaster and when Alma falls pregnant a year later, she has an abortion rather than bring a child into their loveless home. Alma takes over Jim's Café after they divorce in 1982. She emigrates to Florida for a while with a pools winner named Phillip but when he squanders the money, Alma returns to Weatherfield. The character properly begins to make an impact when she takes a more active role in the management of the café in late 1988. This is the beginning of a long-running working relationship with Gail Tilsley (Helen Worth), who becomes Alma's business partner in 1989, until Alma sells her share to Roy Cropper (David Neilson) in 1996.

Alma has a tempestuous on-off relationship with Mike Baldwin (Johnny Briggs). They date but he dumps her and marries Jackie Ingram (Shirin Taylor) in 1990. Alma then dates Mike's enemy, Ken Barlow (William Roache), but she is seduced by Mike after he decides he wants her back and her relationship with Ken dissolves. Alma and Mike marry in 1992. Alma is often the motherly, sympathetic, liberal-minded character in many storylines, particularly off-setting her husband Mike's often harsh and high-minded attitudes. Mike's patronising and chauvinistic mannerisms alienate Alma at times; she occasionally rebels, buying herself a 1979 MG Midget convertible and seeking employment against his wishes. Alma considers straying briefly with Stephen Reid (Todd Boyce) - son of Audrey Roberts (Sue Nicholls) and Gail's half-brother - in 1996. She makes a pass at him but is rebuffed and is hurt further when Mike responds with nonchalance to the incident. She is then caught up in the plight of Don Brennan (Geoffrey Hinsliff). Alma feels sympathy for Don after Mike sells him a garage business at a knowingly inflated price and then watches him go bankrupt. Don eventually has a breakdown, becoming obsessed with revenge on Mike. After attempting to frame Mike for arson and insurance fraud, he kidnaps Alma, driving her into the river in his taxi; both survive. His last act is to steal Alma's car and drive into the viaduct at the end of Coronation Street, killing himself. Alma and Mike separate in 1999 when Alma discovers that Mike has cheated on her; they eventually divorce and Alma moves in with Audrey.

After finding employment at Freshco supermarket, Alma excels in the job and is promoted. She is involved in an armed siege there in 2000, coincidentally along with Mike and Ken amongst others, in which one gunman is shot dead by the police. Following this, Alma grows close to Frank, a security guard at Freshco. They consider moving away to be together but their happiness is cut short as in May 2001, Alma discovers that due to a missed smear test and a further misdiagnosis, she has inoperable terminal cervical cancer. Frank cannot face watching her die and leaves. Alma is supported by her friends, however, and opts to die at home with the people she loves. The cancer claims her life within weeks; Alma passes away at Audrey's home in Grasmere Drive on 17 June 2001, aged 55, with Mike and her friends surrounding her, and her last appearance is three days later when at her wake Audrey plays a goodbye video she'd shot shortly before her death.

Creation

Casting
Alma was introduced in 1981 as a recurring/guest character, the wife of café proprietor Jim Sedgewick. The role saw the return to mainstream television for actress Amanda Barrie, who was previously best known to viewers as Cleopatra in the 1964 comedy film Carry On Cleo. Barrie played Alma in a recurring role for several years, and then, after six years away from the show, she was asked to return as a regular character, Alma taking over control of the café she was given in her divorce settlement from Jim. Barrie has recalled that her first scene was opposite a Coronation Street "legend", Elsie Tanner, played by Pat Phoenix: "She came for a job at the café and I had to tell her she couldn't have one. That was quite scary. It was my first episode but I didn't think the Street took me to its heart because I wasn't called for another eight years. By that time, Jim had gone - I never actually met him!" After Alma's reintroduction as a regular, the British press labelled her as "the next Elsie Tanner", a comparison that Barrie refuted: "I think they always do that. There was only one Elsie Tanner, and I think they will go on looking."

Barrie has revealed that it was thanks to her mother that she was given a permanent role in Coronation Street. According to the actress, she "bombarded" Granada studio  with calls pretending to be a series of fans requesting that Alma be brought back, even speaking directly with producer Bill Podmore.

Development

Relationships
The character went into a business partnership with Gail Tilsey (Helen Worth), formed a close friendship with Audrey Roberts (Sue Nicholls), and had several romantic relationships most notably with Mike Baldwin (Johnny Briggs).

Alma and Mike's romance stemmed back to 1989 and they wed on-screen in 1992, the marriage lasting seven years. It has been suggested in a 2006 ITV documentary that Mike, an antagonistic womanising character, met his match in Alma.  William Roache who plays Ken Barlow has stated that of all Mike's many women in the serial, he always felt that Alma was Mike's true love, the one that was right and good for him. Briggs has stated that he always enjoyed watching the scenes between Mike and Alma, because Alma knew how to handle Mike. Barrie has discussed the way she approached playing the romance between Mike and Alma, suggesting that as Alma she treated Mike in the same way that she [Barrie] treated Briggs off-set, poking fun at him.

Barrie has suggested that she and her co-star Sue Nicholls who plays Audrey Roberts share a friendship that emulates the screen friendship between their two characters. She commented, "Sue Nicholls, who plays Audrey Roberts, is one of my best friends in the Street. We're all so close that we instinctively know how each other is feeling on any given day and we even know how the others will play each scene. If I'm reading a script I can actually hear Sue's voice saying her part, and what expression she will use."

Kidnapping
One of the character's most notable storylines was her kidnapping by Don Brennan (Geoffrey Hinsliff), who attempted to kill Alma by driving her into the River Irwell in a bid for revenge on Mike Baldwin. The events were screened in an hour long special in 1997. The episode ended on a cliffhanger and viewers were left guessing as to whether Alma and Don had survived the crash. Both characters survived, but the storyline marked the exit of  Don, who had been written out of the soap. More than 15 million viewers watched the episode.

Departure
In November 2000 it was announced that Barrie had decided to leave the programme. She stated,  "I thought it was about time I bowed out in the hope that there's one more show in me. I want to endlessly thank Granada and Coronation Street. I've had a very happy time and I feel blessed and proud to have been in the show. But everything has its time. I feel it's time to hand over to the youngsters in the show, who I think are so brilliant [...] I thought it was about time I bowed out. This is something I've been thinking about for ages but couldn't face up to the emotion of leaving or tear myself away." Executive producer Jane Macnaught commented, "We are sorry to see Amanda go and wish her well for the future. She has been a much-loved character and we truly appreciate her loyalty and commitment to the show. I respect her decision and appreciate that she feels she has to move on. We will now work on an exciting exit for the character."

Producers opted to kill off Alma in the serial with terminal cervical cancer, which had already spread to her other organs before detection. A source reported to The Mirror, "we believe Alma's sad death has every ingredient to make it one of the all-time Coronation Street greats." As a precursor to the storyline, Alma had begun a romance with a security guard Frank O'Connor (Eamon Boland) and both had decided to leave Weatherfield to begin a new life together. Discussing the storyline, the source said, "Alma agrees to go and live with Frank. They decide to make a new start together somewhere in the country and begin excitedly telling their plans to people back home. Alma has had her fair share of ups and downs with men in the past and she sees Frank a dependable chap to see out her days with. There's even a surprise farewell party planned at the Rovers. But just as it looks as if they are off into the wide blue yonder the devastating news hits Alma." In the scripts, Alma was faced with a choice, leave Weatherfield, or remain and die with her friends. The source added, "Alma is wrestling with her innermost thoughts about what to do for the best. She is agonising about starting a new life away from Weatherfield with Frank and his children Joe and Danny. But it is Audrey who tells her that she should stay amongst her friends who will be able to nurse her when the time comes. After a lot of hard thinking Alma realises that she will be better off staying with the people who have known and loved her. So she makes the emotional decision to remain with her friends until she dies. We have had some tear-jerking episodes in the past, and Alma's farewell will have to rank as one of the most sorrowful in Corrie's history."

An estimated 15 million viewers tuned in to see Alma's death on-screen. It was reported that a power surge occurred at the episode's climax as there was a 1000 megawatt demand on the National Grid as more than 400,000 kettles were switched on by viewers after the episode. A National Grid spokesman said "Soaps normally average between 400 and 600 megawatts, so it was a considerable increase."

Cancer Research UK was critical of the cervical cancer storyline. They suggested that the writers tried to write the disease around the plot rather than the other way around, leading to unrealistic depiction of cancer. A spokesman for Coronation Street responded in defence of the storyline, saying that Alma's cancer progressed so quickly as she had missed a smear test, and the storyline did have a positive impact on female viewers, resulting in a significant increase in smear testing in the UK. However, a British Medical Journal paper in 2003 warned that the storyline could have unduly worried audiences and placed a burden on the National Health Service (NHS).

References

Coronation Street characters
Television characters introduced in 1981
Fictional shopkeepers
Fictional waiting staff
Fictional characters with cancer
Female characters in television